The Guangxi Sports Center Stadium is a multi-purpose stadium inside the Guangxi Sports Center in Nanning, Guangxi, China. It is currently used mostly for football matches. The stadium holds 60,000 spectators.

External links
 Stadium picture

References

Football venues in China
Multi-purpose stadiums in China